Andrew Steven Biggs (born November 7, 1958) is an American attorney and politician who represents  the United States House of Representatives. The district, which was once represented by U.S. Senators John McCain and Jeff Flake, is in the heart of the East Valley and includes most of Mesa and Chandler and all of Queen Creek and Biggs's hometown of Gilbert.

A Republican, Biggs was a member of the Arizona House of Representatives from 2003 to 2011 and a member of the Arizona Senate from 2011 to 2017. He was president of the Arizona Senate from 2013 to 2017. In 2016, he was elected to Congress. In September 2019, Biggs became chairman of the Freedom Caucus, which includes the House Republican Conference's most conservative members.

Early life
Biggs was born on November 7, 1958, in Tucson, Arizona. When he was young, Biggs went on a mission to Japan for the Church of Jesus Christ of Latter-day Saints and learned to speak fluent Japanese. He later earned his B.A. in Asian studies from Brigham Young University in 1982, his J.D. from the University of Arizona in 1984, and his M.A. in political science from Arizona State University in 1999.

Biggs worked as a lawyer for a firm based in Hobbs, New Mexico, before relocating to Phoenix, where he worked as a prosecutor. In 1993, he won $10 million in the American Family Publishers sweepstakes. He appeared in a TV ad with Dick Clark and Ed McMahon to promote the sweepstakes.

Arizona State Legislature

Elections
Enabled by $10 million in sweepstakes winnings, which made him financially independent, Biggs decided to run for office.

State House of Representatives
 2002: With incumbent Democratic Representative Richard Miranda running for Arizona Senate and John Loredo redistricted to District 13, and with Republican Representative Eddie Farnsworth redistricted from District 30, Biggs ran in the five-way September 10 Republican primary, placing second with 5,778 votes. Biggs and Farnsworth were unopposed in the general election, where Biggs took the first seat with 31,812 votes and Farnsworth took the second.
 2004: Biggs and Farnsworth were unopposed in the September 7 Republican primary; Farnsworth placed first and Biggs placed second with 11,202 votes. In the three-way general election, Farnsworth took the first seat and Biggs the second with 51,932 votes, ahead of Libertarian candidate Wade Reynolds.
 2006: Biggs and Farnsworth were challenged in the four-way September 12 Republican primary; Farnsworth placed first and Biggs placed second with 7,793 votes. In the three-way general election, Farnsworth took the first seat and Biggs the second with 38,085 votes, ahead of Libertarian candidate Edward Schwebel.
 2008: With Farnsworth running for Arizona Senate and leaving a House District 22 seat open, Biggs ran in the four-way September 2 Republican primary, placing first with 9,800 votes. Biggs and fellow Republican nominee Laurin Hendrix won the general election, where Biggs took the first seat with 59,615 votes and Hendrix the second, ahead of Democratic nominee Glenn Ray, who had run for the district's senate seat in 2006.

State Senate
 2010: When Republican Senator Thayer Verschoor ran for State Treasurer of Arizona and left the Senate District 22 seat open, Biggs was unopposed in both the August 24 Republican primary, winning with 25,792 votes, and the November 2 general election, winning with 59,933 votes.
 2012: Redistricted to District 12, and with incumbent Republican Senator John B. Nelson redistricted to District 13, Biggs was unopposed in both the August 28 Republican primary, winning with 19,844 votes, and the November 6 general election, winning with 63,812 votes.

U.S. House of Representatives

Elections 
In 2016, Biggs ran for Congress from the 5th District to replace retiring Representative Matt Salmon. He led the field in the four-way Republican primary, finishing nine votes ahead of his nearest opponent, businesswoman Christine Jones. A recanvass boosted Biggs's margin to 16 votes, and an automatic recount confirmed him as the nominee by 27 votes. His primary victory virtually assured him of being the next representative from the district; the 5th and its predecessors have been in Republican hands for all but one term since 1953.

Biggs defeated Democratic nominee Talia Fuentes, 64.1% to 35.9%. He was not required to give up his state senate seat under Arizona's resign-to-run laws, since he was in the last year of what would have been his final term in the chamber.

Tenure 
Biggs is a member of the Congressional Western Caucus and the Republican Study Committee. In September 2019, he replaced Mark Meadows as chair of the Freedom Caucus.

Biggs voted for the Tax Cuts and Jobs Act of 2017. After the vote, he said the bill would "provide much-needed economic relief" to American citizens and businesses.

On March 4, 2020, Ken Buck and Biggs were the only two representatives to vote against an $8.3 billion emergency aid package meant to help the U.S. respond to the COVID-19 pandemic. In a statement, Biggs called the bill "larded-up" and "bloated". Ten days later, he voted against the larger Coronavirus Response Act, which passed the House, 363–40. Biggs said he opposed the second bill because it provided benefits to domestic partners and thereby "redefined the family".

Contesting the 2020 presidential election
In 2020, Biggs joined Representative Paul Gosar in a video falsely claiming there was widespread voter fraud in the 2020 presidential election. They claimed that Arizona's voting machines were faulty, and Biggs claimed that poll watchers were allowed to participate in vote tabulations in Detroit. They also demanded an audit of Maricopa County's vote count. Later, Biggs falsely claimed that 10,000 Maricopa County voters were "disenfranchised" without giving evidence.

In December 2020, Biggs was among 126 House Republicans to sign an amicus brief for Texas v. Pennsylvania, an unsuccessful lawsuit that asked the Supreme Court to overturn election results from Georgia, Michigan, Pennsylvania, and Wisconsin, thereby denying Joe Biden from taking office as president.

Biggs also spoke at rallies promoting the "Stop the Steal" election conspiracy movement, and has claimed antifa was behind the January 6, 2021, storming of the U.S. Capitol. He denied that he was involved in planning the event and the riots as alleged by Rolling Stone and a video posted by Stop the Steal organizer Ali Alexander. In a deposition to the January 6 committee of the House of Representatives, Alexander testified that he spoke in person with Biggs before the events.

On October 7, 2021, Biggs again falsely claimed that "we don't know who won Arizona in the 2020 presidential election".

2021 attack on the United States Capitol
During the 2021 attack on the U.S. Capitol, Biggs and all other House members were ushered to a secure location when the House chamber was cleared. A video of Biggs later surfaced in which he refused to wear a face mask during the covid pandemic in violation of House rules. Sources noted that after the siege lockdown, during which several other congressional Republicans also refused to wear masks, three House Democrats tested positive for COVID-19. Biggs subsequently voted to object to Arizona's and Pennsylvania's electoral votes that day, joining 146 House Republicans.

On January 12, 2021, Biggs called on Representative Liz Cheney to resign from her leadership position in the Republican caucus after she voted in favor of Donald Trump's second impeachment.

In the aftermath of the events on January 6, Biggs's brothers William and Daniel wrote a letter to the editor of The Arizona Republic demanding their brother's removal from office. They wrote that Biggs is "at least partially to blame" for the Capitol storming. They also condemned his refusal to wear a mask in the secure location. According to William and Daniel Biggs, this "was a passive-aggressive tantrum and the ultimate disrespect for all present".

Biggs was one of 12 House Republicans to vote against H.R 1085 to award three Congressional Gold Medals to the United States Capitol Police who protected the Capitol on January 6. In June 2021, he and 20 other House Republicans voted against a similar resolution.

The House committee investigating the January 6 attack subpoenaed Biggs on May 12, 2022. During the committee hearing on June 21, 2022, Speaker of the Arizona House Russell Bowers testified that Biggs called him on the morning of January 6 asking him to sign a letter calling for decertification of the Arizona electors. On June 23, 2022, witnesses confirmed that Biggs had asked for a presidential pardon for his activities related to the certification of the vote.

Foreign and defense policy
Biggs was among 60 Republicans to oppose condemning Trump's action of withdrawing forces from Syria. He, Matt Gaetz, and a handful of other Republicans broke with their party and voted to end Saudi assistance to the War in Yemen.

On March 19, 2021, Biggs voted against a House resolution to condemn the military coup in Myanmar. The resolution passed, 398–14, with one other member, Paul Gosar, voting present. Biggs called the violence "tragic" but added that "there is suffering everywhere in the world" and the U.S. "can't be the military police for the entire world", claiming the resolution was a way to "put our foot in the door in Burma." The resolution was symbolic and did not call for use of force.

In June 2021, Biggs was one of 49 House Republicans to voted to repeal the AUMF against Iraq.

Biggs was one of 15 representatives to vote against H.R. 567: Trans-Sahara Counterterrorism Partnership Program Act of 2021, which would establish an interagency program to assist countries in North and West Africa to improve immediate and long-term capabilities to counter terrorist threats, and for other purposes.

In July 2021, Biggs voted against the bipartisan ALLIES Act, which would increase by 8,000 the number of special immigrant visas for Afghan allies of the U.S. military during its invasion of Afghanistan, while also reducing some application requirements that caused long application backlogs; the bill passed the House, 407–16.

In September 2021, Biggs was among 75 House Republicans to vote against the National Defense Authorization Act of 2022, which contains a provision that would require women to be drafted.

Biggs was among 19 House Republicans to vote against the final passage of the 2022 National Defense Authorization Act.

In February 2022, Biggs co-sponsored the Secure America's Borders First Act, which would prohibit the expenditure or obligation of military and security assistance to Kyiv over the U.S. border with Mexico.

In 2022, Biggs voted against a bill to provide approximately $14 billion to the government of Ukraine.

In July 2022, Biggs was one of 14 House Republicans to vote for an amendment that would have removed a proposed $37 billion spending increase in the defense budget.

In July 2022, Biggs was one of 18 Republicans to vote against ratifying Sweden's and Finland's applications for NATO membership.

In 2023, Biggs was among 47 Republicans to vote in favor of H.Con.Res. 21 which directed President Joe Biden to remove U.S. troops from Syria within 180 days.

Biden administration
In August 2021, during the 117th U.S. Congress, Biggs sponsored a resolution to impeach Secretary of Homeland Security Alejandro Mayorkas. Biggs is also supporter of efforts to impeach President Joe Biden. During the 117th United States Congress, Biggs co-sponsored two resolutions to impeach Biden. During the 117th Congress, Biggs also co-sponsored two resolutions to impeach Attorney General Merrick Garland.

2023 Speaker election

Biggs ran in the Republican conference election for Speaker of the House of Representatives against Kevin McCarthy, then the House Minority Leader. McCarthy defeated him, 188 votes to 31. In the 2023 Speaker election, fellow Freedom Caucus member Paul Gosar nominated Biggs. He received 10 votes on the first ballot, which, alongside nine votes for other Republican candidates, was enough to necessitate a second ballot. This made the 2023 election the first to take more than one ballot since 1923. Biggs was not nominated for the second ballot, and voted for Jim Jordan. He did not receive any votes on ballots 2 through 13, but received 2 votes on the 14th ballot despite not being nominated.

Committee assignments
 Committee on the Judiciary
 Subcommittee on Courts, Intellectual Property and the Internet
 Subcommittee on Immigration and Border Security
 Committee on Oversight
 Subcommittee on Civil Rights and Civil Liberties
 Subcommittee on Government Operations

Previous assignments
 Committee on Science, Space, and Technology (2017–2021)
 Subcommittee on Environment
 Subcommittee on Energy
 Subcommittee on Investigations and Oversight

Caucus memberships 
 Freedom Caucus (chair)
Congressional Western Caucus

Political positions

During the presidency of Donald Trump, Biggs voted in line with the president's stated position 82.9% of the time. During the presidency of Joe Biden, Biggs has voted in line with the president's stated position 5.1% of the time.

Biggs chairs the Freedom Caucus, which has been described as right-wing populist.

Abortion 
Biggs is "opposed to all forms of elective abortion". He has argued in favor of abolishing the filibuster to make it easier to pass anti-abortion laws. He has attended a conference hosted by the Susan B. Anthony List, an anti-abortion group. He supported the 2022 overturning of Roe v. Wade, calling it "a major victory for the unborn."

Biggs has received mixed ratings from special interest groups focused on abortion. In 2019, he received a 0% rating from NARAL Pro-Choice America. He has a 15% lifetime rating from Planned Parenthood, which supports legal access to abortion, and a 100% rating from Campaign for Working Families, which opposes legal abortion.

Article V convention
Biggs opposes a convention to propose amendments to the United States Constitution, also known as an Article V convention. During his tenure as Arizona Senate president, Biggs blocked a resolution calling for a convention. In 2015, Biggs published a book, The Con of the Con-Con, arguing against a convention.

Climate change 
In comments at an April 2017 constituent town hall, frequently interrupted by boos, Biggs rejected the scientific consensus on climate change, asserting in a halting answer, "There are credible scientists who say it exists; we aren't sure why", and "there are credible scientists who say it doesn't." Replying to a candidate survey from The Arizona Republic, Biggs wrote, "I do not believe climate change is occurring. I do not think that humans have a significant impact on climate. The federal government should stop regulating and stomping on our economy and freedoms in the name of a discredited theory." He submitted an amendment to the 2018 spending bill that would defund the National Climate Assessment and urged President Donald Trump to withdraw from the Paris Accords. In February 2020, when Republican House Minority Leader Kevin McCarthy attempted to make a modest effort to gather the support of concerned young voters via a restrained approach to address climate change, Biggs and other hardline denialists objected. Biggs said: "People are like, 'Is this an official rollout? It can't be official. We didn't vote on it'."

While factions of the Republican Party were split on whether to continue climate change denial, conservative groups such as the Club for Growth and the Competitive Enterprise Institute supported continuation. In 2018, Biggs was the sole House member to receive a 100% rating from the CFG.

COVID-19

Biggs opposes wearing masks to prevent the transmission of COVID-19, encouraging Arizonans not to wear them. In July 2020, he tweeted that people should not trust Anthony Fauci or Deborah Birx. He has called for the White House Coronavirus Task Force to be disbanded. During a major outbreak in the summer of 2020 in Arizona, Biggs questioned the hospitalization numbers and called Governor Doug Ducey's two-month lockdown a result of "hysteria" from "Democratic Leftists." In September 2020, Biggs posted a series of tweets supporting the use of hydroxychloroquine to prevent COVID-19. There is no strong evidence to support the use of hydroxychloroquine to treat COVID-19.

On March 4, 2020, Biggs and Ken Buck were the only two representatives to vote against an $8.3 billion COVID-19 aid package. Biggs called the bill "larded-up" and "bloated". Ten days later, he voted against the larger Coronavirus Response Act, saying that because it provided benefits to domestic partners, it "redefined the family." In December 2020, Biggs called on Trump to veto the Consolidated Appropriations Act, 2021, which included $900 billion in stimulus relief for the pandemic. The legislation was the first bill to address the pandemic since April 2020.

Healthcare
In 2018, Biggs sponsored a bill "designed to let very sick patients request access to experimental medicines without government oversight", which passed the House, 267–149. Biggs said the bill was "not false hope; it is hope."

Juneteenth
In June 2021, Biggs was among 14 House Republicans who voted against passing legislation to establish June 19, or Juneteenth, as a federal holiday.

LGBT rights 
Biggs is a former policy advisor to United Families International, a nonprofit that opposes same-sex marriage. Biggs condemned the Supreme Court ruling in Obergefell v. Hodges, which held that same-sex marriage bans violated the US constitution.

Net neutrality 
Biggs has gone on record as opposing net neutrality, and favored FCC Chairman Ajit Pai's plan to end it. In a letter to his constituents, Biggs wrote, "we should allow the free market to expand the internet and its services." He has accepted $19,500 in campaign donations from the telecommunications industry.

Robert Mueller
On June 23, 2017, Biggs was one of three Republicans who called for the resignation of Robert Mueller, the prosecutor investigating Russian interference in the 2016 presidential election, on the grounds that Mueller could not conduct his investigation fairly because of events that happened when he was the acting director of the FBI.

On March 19, 2018, Biggs renewed his call for Mueller to resign. On July 25, 2018, Biggs and nine other Republicans co-sponsored a resolution to impeach Deputy Attorney General Rod Rosenstein, who was Mueller's direct supervisor after the recusal of Attorney General Jeff Sessions.

On April 8, 2019, The Arizona Republic published an op-ed by Biggs on the initial findings of the Mueller investigation. In it, Biggs called the investigation "an illegitimate attack on the executive branch" and wrote that the findings "demonstrate the weakness of the initial premise to investigate Trump, his family and campaign staff." He blamed the investigation on "the media that fueled this bogus attempt to overthrow the will of the American voter." Biggs's op-ed was published well ahead of the release of Mueller's full report on April 18, 2019, and was most likely written in response to a four-page summary of the report by Attorney General William Barr released on March 24. After the publication of the full report, Biggs posted a video on Twitter declaring that there was "no basis for an obstruction [of justice] charge" against Trump, chastising the Democratic party for attempting to "undermine the POTUS".

Texting while driving 
In 2017, Biggs used his powers as transportation chair and president of the Arizona State Senate to block a bill banning driving while texting for holders of a learning permit.

9/11 Victims Compensation Fund
In 2019, Biggs was one of 11 House Republicans to oppose funding for the September 11 Victims Compensation Fund bill H.R. 1327. On July 12, 2019, the measure passed the House, 402–12.

Immigration
Biggs voted against the Fairness for High-Skilled Immigrants Act of 2019 which would amend the Immigration and Nationality Act to eliminate the per-country numerical limitation for employment-based immigrants, to increase the per-country numerical limitation for family-sponsored immigrants, and for other purposes.

Biggs voted against the Further Consolidated Appropriations Act of 2020 which authorizes DHS to nearly double the available H-2B visas for the remainder of FY 2020.

Biggs voted against Consolidated Appropriations Act (H.R. 1158) which effectively prohibits ICE from cooperating with Health and Human Services to detain or remove illegal alien sponsors of unaccompanied alien children (UACs).

Big Tech
In 2022, Biggs was one of 39 Republicans to vote for the Merger Filing Fee Modernization Act of 2022, an antitrust package that would crack down on corporations for anti-competitive behavior.

Personal life 
Biggs is married to Cindy Biggs. He is a member of the Church of Jesus Christ of Latter-day Saints.

Published works

References

External links

 Congressman Andy Biggs official U.S. House website
 Campaign website
 
 
 

|-

|-

|-

|-

|-

1958 births
Living people
21st-century American politicians
American Latter Day Saints
American nationalists
Arizona lawyers
Republican Party Arizona state senators
Arizona State University alumni
Brigham Young University alumni
Latter Day Saints from Arizona
Lawyers from Tucson, Arizona
Republican Party members of the Arizona House of Representatives
People from Gilbert, Arizona
Politicians from Tucson, Arizona
Far-right politicians in the United States
Presidents of the Arizona Senate
Republican Party members of the United States House of Representatives from Arizona
Right-wing populism in the United States
University of Arizona alumni